Dr. Jai P. Nagarkatti (February 18, 1947 in Hyderabad, India – November 13, 2010 in Saint Louis, Missouri) was an American chemist and businessman who served as the chairman, chief operating officer, CEO, and president of Sigma Aldrich.

Nagarkatti joined Sigma-Aldrich in 1976, after graduating from Texas A&M University–Commerce, and worked there for the rest of his career. In 2004, he became company president and chief operating officer; in 2005 he joined the board of directors, followed by becoming CEO in 2006 and chairman of the board in 2009.

The Reading Garden at Samuel C. Sachs Branch of St. Louis County Library in Chesterfield, MO which opened in 2015 was named “Jai Nagarkatti Monsanto Company Reading Garden”, in honor of Mr. Nagarkatti.

References

External links
Obituary from the Saint Louis Post-Dispatch, archived at legacy.com
2008 profile on Dr. Nagarkatti at St. Louis Commerce

1947 births
2010 deaths
Scientists from Hyderabad, India
American chemists
20th-century Indian chemists
American people of Telugu descent
Osmania University alumni
Texas A&M University alumni
American chairpersons of corporations
Indian chief operating officers
American technology chief executives